Islam is the second largest religion in the United Kingdom, with results from the 2011 Census giving the total population as 2,786,635, or 4.4% of the total UK population, while the 2021 Census results released so far show a population of 3,868,133 (6.5%) in England and Wales, 3,801,178 in England and 66,950 in Wales. The 2011 census reported 76,737 Muslims in Scotland (1.45%). London has the greatest population of Muslims in the country. The vast majority of Muslims in the United Kingdom adhere to Sunni Islam, while smaller numbers are associated with Shia Islam.

During the Middle Ages, there was some general cultural exchange between Christendom and the Islamic world, however, there were no Muslims in the British Isles (a few Crusaders did convert in the East, such as Robert of St. Albans). During the Elizabethan age, contacts became more explicit as the Tudors made alliances against Catholic Habsburg Spain, including with Morocco and the Ottoman Empire. As the British Empire grew, particularly in India, Britain came to rule territories with many Muslim inhabitants; some of these, known as the lascars, are known to have settled in Britain from the mid-18th century onwards. In the 19th century, Victorian Orientalism spurred an interest in Islam and some British people, including aristocrats, converted to Islam. Marmaduke Pickthall, an English writer and novelist, and a convert to Islam, provided the first complete English-language translation of the Qur'an by a British Muslim in 1930.

Under the British Indian Army, a significant number of Muslims fought for the United Kingdom during the First and the Second World Wars (a number of whom were awarded the Victoria Cross, Britain's highest honour). In the decades following the latter conflict and the Partition of India in 1947, many Muslims (from what is today Bangladesh, India and Pakistan) settled in Britain itself. To this day, British Asians constitute the majority of Muslims in Britain in terms of ethnicity, although there are significant Turkish, Arab and Somali communities, as well as up to 100,000 British converts of multiple ethnic backgrounds. Islam is the fastest growing religion in the United Kingdom and its adherents have the lowest average age out of all the major religious groups. Between 2001 and 2009, the Muslim population increased almost 10 times faster than the non-Muslim population.

History

Early history

Although Islam is generally thought of as a recent arrival in the UK, Muslims have been trading and exchanging ideas with the British for centuries.

The earliest evidence of Islamic influence in England dates to the 8th century, when Offa, the Anglo-Saxon king of Mercia, minted a coin with an Arabic inscription, largely a copy of coins issued by a contemporary Abbasid ruler, Caliph Al-Mansur. In the 16th century, Muslims from North Africa, the Middle East and Central Asia were present in London, working in a range of roles, from diplomats and translators to merchants and musicians.

Interactions under British Empire

Bengal was annexed by the East India Company from the quasi-independent Nawabs of Bengal following the Battle of Plassey in 1757. The manufactured goods produced in Bengal directly contributed to the Industrial Revolution in Britain, with the textiles produced in Bengal being used to support British industries such as textile manufacturing, aided by the invention of devices such as the spinning jenny. With the establishment of Crown control in India after 1857, the British Empire came to rule over a large Muslim population. The first educated South Asian to travel to Europe and live in Britain was I'tisam-ud-Din, a Bengali Muslim cleric, munshi and diplomat to the Mughal Empire who arrived in 1765 with his servant Muhammad Muqim during the reign of King George III. He wrote of his experiences and travels in his Persian book,  (or 'Wonder Book of Europe').

In South Asia, specifically, the British ruled over one of the largest Muslim populations in the world. Upon coming into contact with such a population, the British authorities forged a uniquely Muslim identity for the local believers. This was, in part, due to the way British historians periodized South Asian history into an "ancient" Hindu one and a "medieval" Muslim one. Under the system, the colonial period was classified as "modern". Debate rages on concerning the utility and legitimacy of these labels themselves. Problems with these labels range from the connotations coupled with the word 'medieval' to the implications related to labelling the colonial era as "modern". The term medieval itself is quite controversial. Historians writing in journals relating to the time period have asked whether the term is a "tyrannous construct" or an "alien conceptual hegemony". This is because the label was originally developed during the study of European history to mark the period in between the fall of the Roman Empire and the fall of Constantinople.

Such classifications done by British historians throughout their long period of rule paved the way for a more cohesive Muslim identity. In the eighteenth century, this seemed unlikely. Muslims who hailed from Afghan, Turk, Persian, or Arab roots did not find their Muslim identities especially salient. Mughal courts divided not into Hindu or Muslim factions but Persian and Turkish ones. Converts to the religion outside of courtly life, the majority of the Muslim population in the Subcontinent, too were more focused on their regional and lingual cultural identities-whether that be Bengali, Punjabi, Sindhi, or Gujarati.

The first group of Muslims to come to Great Britain in significant numbers, in the 18th century, were lascars (sailors) recruited from the Indian subcontinent, largely from the Bengal region, to work for the East India Company on British ships, some of whom settled down and took local wives. Due to the majority being lascars, the earliest Muslim communities were found in port towns. Naval cooks also came, many of them from the Sylhet district of British Bengal (now in Bangladesh). One of the most famous early Asian immigrants to England was the Bengali Muslim entrepreneur Sake Dean Mahomet, a captain of the East India Company who in 1810 founded London's first Indian restaurant, the Hindoostanee Coffee House.

Between 1803 and 1813, there were more than 10,000 lascars from the Indian subcontinent visiting British port cities and towns. By 1842, 3,000 lascars visited the UK annually, and by 1855, 12,000 lascars were arriving annually in British ports. In 1873, 3,271 lascars arrived in Britain. Throughout the early 19th century lascars visited Britain at a rate of 1,000 every year, which increased to a rate of 10,000 to 12,000 every year throughout the late 19th century. A prominent English convert of the 19th century was Henry Stanley, 3rd Baron Stanley of Alderley, who became a Muslim in 1862. Although not a convert himself, the Victorian Age adventurer, Sir Richard Francis Burton visited Mecca in disguise, documented in The Book of the Thousand Nights and a Night. At the beginning of World War I, there were 51,616 South Asian lascars working on British ships, the majority of whom were of Bengali descent. In 1932, the Indian National Congress survey of 'all Indians outside India' (which included modern Pakistani and Bangladeshi territories) estimated that there were 7,128 Indians living in the United Kingdom.

By 1911, the British Empire had a Muslim population of 94 million, larger than the empire's 58 million Christian population. By the 1920s, the British Empire included roughly half of the world's Muslim population. More than 400,000 Muslim soldiers of the British Indian Army fought for Britain during World War I, where 62,060 were killed in action. Muslim soldiers of the British Indian Army later fought for Britain against the Nazis in World War II, where Muslim soldiers accounted for up to 40% of the 2.5 million troops serving the British Indian Army. David Lloyd George, British Prime Minister from 1916 to 1922, stated: "we are the greatest Mahomedan power in the world and one-fourth of the population of the British Empire is Mahomedan. There have been no more loyal adherents to the throne and no more effective and loyal supporters of the Empire in its hour of trial." This statement was later reiterated by Gandhi in 1920. Winston Churchill also stated in 1942: "We must not on any account break with the Moslems, who represent a hundred million people, and the main army elements on which we must rely for the immediate fighting."

The Shah Jahan Mosque in Woking was the first purpose-built mosque in Britain, and was built in 1889. In the same year, Abdullah Quilliam installed a mosque in a terrace in Liverpool, which became the Liverpool Muslim Institute. The first mosque in London was the Fazl Mosque, established in 1924, commonly called the London mosque.

Quran translators Yusuf Ali and Marmaduke Pickthall, who authored The Meaning of the Glorious Koran: An Explanatory Translation in 1930, were both trustees of the Shah Jehan Mosque in Woking and the East London Mosque.

Other aristocratic British converts included Sir Archibald Hamilton, 5th Baronet, Rowland Allanson-Winn, 5th Baron Headley, St John Philby and Zainab Cobbold (the first Muslim woman born in Britain to perform the pilgrimage to Mecca).

Immigration and post-World War II

Large-scale immigration of Muslims to Britain began after World War II, as a result of the destruction and labour shortages caused by the war. Muslim migrants from former British colonies, predominantly India, Pakistan, and Bangladesh, were recruited in large numbers by government and businesses to rebuild the country. Large numbers of doctors recruited from India and Pakistan, encouraged by health minister Enoch Powell in the early 1960s, also played a key role in the establishment of the National Health Service.

British Asians (both Muslim and non-Muslim) faced increased discrimination following Powell's Rivers of Blood speech and the establishment of the National Front in the late 1960s. This included overt racism in the form of "Paki bashing", predominantly from white power skinheads, the National Front, and the British National Party, throughout the 1970s and 1980s. Drawing inspiration from the civil rights movement, the black power movement, and the anti-apartheid movement, young British Pakistani and British Bangladeshi activists began a number of anti-racist Asian youth movements in the 1970s and 1980s, including the Bradford Youth Movement in 1977, the Bangladeshi Youth Movement following the murder of Altab Ali in 1978, and the Newham Youth Movement following the murder of Akhtar Ali Baig in 1980.

The majority of mosques founded after World War II in Britain are reflective of the major strands of Sunni Islam predominating in the Indian subcontinent; namely Deobandi and Barelvi (the latter of which is more Sufi-orientated). In addition to this there are Twelver Shia Mosques. The Murabitun World Movement founded by Abdalqadir as-Sufi (born Ian Dallas) in 1968 is a branch of the Sufi Darqawi-Shadhili-Qadiri tariqa which was run out of Achnagairn in the Scottish Highlands.

Martin Lings, an English Muslim scholar, published a significant biography of the Prophet Muhammad in 1983 entitled Muhammad: His Life Based on the Earliest Sources. The publication of Salman Rushdie's novel The Satanic Verses in 1988 caused major controversy. A number of Muslims in Britain condemned the book for blasphemy. On 2 December 1988, the book was publicly burned at a demonstration in Bolton attended by 7,000 Muslims, followed by a similar demonstration and book-burning in Bradford on 14 January 1989. The growing number of Muslims resulted in the establishment of more than 1,500 mosques by 2007.

Demographics

The Muslim population of England and Wales has grown consistently since World War II. Sophie Gilliat-Ray attributes the recent growth to "recent immigration, the higher than average birth rate, some conversion to Islam".

According to the 2021 United Kingdom census, Muslims in England and Wales enumerated 3,868,133, or 6.5% of the population.

According to recent projections the Muslim population in the UK in the year 2050 is likely to number around 13 million.

The top 20 local authorities in England and Wales with the highest percentage of Muslims in 2021 were:
 London Borough of Tower Hamlets:         39.9% (123,912)
 Blackburn with Darwen:                   35.0% (54,146)
 London Borough of Newham:           34.8% (122,146)
 Luton:                                               32.9% (74,191)
 London Borough of Redbridge:       31.3% (97,068)
 City of Bradford:                               30.5% (166,846)
 Birmingham:                                    29.9% (341,811)
 Slough:                                            29.4% (46,661)
 Pendle:                                           26.0% (24,900)
 Metropolitan Borough of Oldham:  24.4% (59,031)
 Leicester:                                        23.5% (86,443)
 Manchester:                                   22.3% (122,962)
 London Borough of Waltham Forest: 21.6% (60,157)
 London Borough of Brent:              21.4% (72,574)
 City of Westminster:                       20.0% (40,873)
 Bolton:                                                                         19.9% (58,997)
 London Borough of Ealing:            18.8% (68,907)
 Rochdale:                                                                    18.8% (42,121)
 London Borough of Enfield:           18.6% (61,477)
 Kirklees:                                         18.5% (80,046)
 Camden:                                                                   16.1% (33,830)
 Harrow:                                                                     15.9% (41,503)
 Sandwell:                                                                   13.4% (45,763)
 London Borough of Hackney:        13.3% (34,578)
 London Borough of Haringey:        12.6% (33,295)
 Nottingham: 12.2% (39,540)

Several large cities have one area that is a majority Muslim even if the rest of the city has a fairly small Muslim population. In addition, it is possible to find small areas that are almost entirely Muslim: for example, Savile Town in Dewsbury.

Initial limited mosque availability meant that prayers were conducted in small rooms of council flats until the 1980s when more and larger facilities became available. Some synagogues and community buildings were turned into mosques and existing mosques began to expand their buildings. This process has continued down to the present day with the East London Mosque recently expanding into a large former car park where the London Muslim Centre is now used for prayers, recreational facilities and housing.

The 2001 census recorded that there were 179,733 Muslims who described themselves as 'white'. 65% of white Muslims described themselves as "other white", and would likely have originated from locations such as Bosnia and Herzegovina, Kosovo, Adygea, Chechnya, Albania, Turkey, Bulgaria, the region of East Macedonia and Thrace in Northern Greece, and North Macedonia. The remainder of white Muslims are converts and mostly identified themselves as White British and White Irish.

Islam is the third-largest religious group of British Indian people, after Hinduism and Sikhism. 8% of UK Muslims are of Indian descent, principally those whose origins are in Gujarat, West Bengal, Telangana and Kerala. Gujarati Muslims from the Surat and Bharuch districts started to arrive from the 1940s when India was under British colonial rule, settling in the towns of Dewsbury and Batley in Yorkshire and in parts of Lancashire.

South Asian

Pakistanis

The single largest group of Muslims in the United Kingdom are of Pakistani descent. Pakistanis were one of the first South Asian Muslim communities to permanently settle in the United Kingdom, arriving in England first in the late 1940s. Immigration from Mirpur in Pakistan grew from the late 1950s, accompanied by immigration from other parts of Pakistan especially from Punjab, particularly from the surrounding Punjab villages of Faisalabad, Sahiwal, Sialkot, Jhelum, Gujar Khan and Gujarat, in addition to from the north-west Punjab including the chhachhi Pathans and Pashtuns from Attock District, and some from villages of Ghazi, Nowshera and Peshawar. There is also a fairly large Punjabi community from East Africa found in London. People of Pakistani extraction are particularly notable in West Midlands, West Yorkshire, London, Lancashire/Greater Manchester and several industrial towns such as Luton, Slough and High Wycombe in the Home Counties. There are smaller numbers of Sindhis in Greater London. Pakistanis were traditionally working class but are slowly progressing into a Metropolitan middle class; they continue to face social integration issues.

Bangladeshis

People of Bangladeshi descent are the second largest Muslim community (after Pakistanis), 15% of Muslims in England and Wales are of Bangladeshi descent, one of the ethnic groups in the UK with the largest proportion of people following a single religion, being 92% Muslim. The majority of these Muslims come from the Sylhet Division of Bangladesh. Many mosques opened by the British Bangladeshi community are often named after Shah Jalal and other Sufi saints who took part in the Islamic conquest of Sylhet in 1303. British Bangladeshi Muslims are mainly concentrated in London (Tower Hamlets and Newham), Luton, Birmingham and Oldham. The Bangladeshi Muslim community in London forms 24% of the Muslim population, larger than any other ethnic group. Other smaller Bangladeshi Muslim communities are present in Newcastle upon Tyne, Bradford, Manchester, Sunderland, Portsmouth, and Rochdale.

There are groups which are active throughout Bangladeshi communities such as The Young Muslim Organisation. Other large groups include another Sunni movement, the Fultoli (founded in Sylhet), and the Tablighi Jamaat – which is a missionary and revival movement, and avoids political attention. The Hizb ut-Tahrir calls for the Khilafah (caliphate) and influences by publishing annual magazines, and lectures through mainly political concepts, and the other which is a movement within Sunni Islam is the Salafi – who view the teachings of the first generations after Muhammed as the correct teachings, and appeals to younger Muslims as a way to differentiate themselves towards their elders. All these groups work to stimulate Islamic identity among local Bengalis or Muslims and particularly focus on the younger members of the communities. The British Bangladeshi community has held a strong point in Islam, often opening large mosques such as East London Mosque and Brick Lane Masjid, as well as opening madrassas and Islamic TV channels.

Indians
There are large numbers of Gujarati Muslims in Dewsbury, Blackburn (including Darwen), Bolton, Preston, Nottingham, Leicester, Nuneaton, Gloucester and London (Newham, Waltham Forest and Hackney).

Middle Eastern

Turks

Turks in the United Kingdom represent a unique community in the country because they have emigrated not only from the Republic of Turkey but also from other former Ottoman regions; in fact, the majority of British Turks are Turkish Cypriots who migrated from the island of Cyprus from the British colonial period onwards. The second largest Turkish community descend from Turkey. There has also been ethnic Turkish migration waves from Arabic-speaking countries (such as Iraq and Syria) as well as the Balkans (including Bulgaria, Greece, and Romania). A report published by the Home Affairs Committee in 2011 claimed that there was 500,000 British Turks, made up of approximately 150,000 Turkish nationals, 300,000 Turkish Cypriots, and the remainder from other countries. , there was a growing number of ethnic Turks from the modern diaspora in Western Europe; for example, Turks with German and Dutch citizenship (i.e. Turkish Germans and Turkish Dutch) had also immigrated to Britain in accordance with the freedom of movement under EU law.

Turkish Cypriots first began to migrate to the United Kingdom in 1917. At the time, the British Empire had already annexed Cyprus and the residents of Cyprus became subjects of the Crown. Migration continued through the 1920s; during the Second World War, the number of Turkish-run cafes increased from 20 in 1939 to 200 in 1945 – creating a demand for more Turkish Cypriot workers. However, due to the Cyprus conflict, many Turkish Cypriots began to leave the island for political reasons in the 1950s, with the numbers increasing significantly after the intercommunal violence of late 1963. With the subsequent division of the island in 1974 (followed by the declaration of the Turkish Republic of Northern Cyprus in 1983) an economic embargo against the Turkish Cypriots by the Greek Cypriot controlled Republic of Cyprus, caused a further 130,000 Turkish Cypriots to leave the Island for the United Kingdom.

Migrant workers from the Republic of Turkey began to arrive in large numbers in the 1970s, followed by their family members in the late 1970s and 1980s. Many of these workers were recruited by Turkish Cypriots who had already established businesses such as restaurants. These workers were required to renew their work permits every year until they became residents after living in the country for five years. By the 1980s, intellectuals, including students, and highly educated professionals arrived in the country, most of which received support from the Turkish Cypriot community. Mainland Turks settled in similar areas of London in which the Turkish Cypriots lived in; however, many have also moved to the outer districts, such as Essex.

The Turkish community have established several mosques in the country. The first was Shacklewell Lane Mosque, established by the Turkish Cypriot community in 1977. There are numerous other Turkish mosques in London, mainly in Hackney, including the Aziziye Mosque and Suleymaniye Mosque. Notable Turkish mosques outside London include Selimiye Mosque in Manchester, Hamidiye Mosque in Leicester, and Osmaniye Mosque in Stoke-on-Trent.

Turks from the same districts from their homeland tend to congregate in the same quarters in the UK. The majority live in capital city of London, particularly in Hackney, Haringey, Enfield, Lewisham, Lambeth, Southwark, Croydon, Islington, Kensington, Waltham Forest, and Wood Green. Outside London there are smaller Turkish communities in Birmingham, Hertfordshire, Luton, Manchester, Sheffield and the East Midlands.

Kurds

The UK has a significant Iraqi Kurdish population. Academic sources indicate that 65–70% of people originating from Iraq are Kurdish Iraqis. Nearly all Iraqi Kurds are Muslims.

According to the Department for Communities and Local Government, the Iraqi Kurds make up the largest group of Kurds in the country, exceeding the numbers from Turkey and Iran.

Arabs

People of Arab origin in Britain are the descendants of Arab immigrants to Britain from a variety of Arab states, including Yemen, Syria, Iraq, Lebanon, Jordan, Egypt and Palestine. Most British Arabs are Sunni Muslim, although some – such as those of Iraqi and Lebanese origin – are Shi'ite. The main Arab Muslim communities in the UK live in the Greater London area, with smaller numbers living in Manchester, Liverpool, and Birmingham. There are also sizable and very long-established communities of Muslim Yemenis in the United Kingdom in among other places Cardiff and the South Shields area near Newcastle.

The 2001 UK Census recorded 32,236 Iraqi-born residents, and the Office for National Statistics estimates that, as of 2009, this figure had risen to around 65,000. According to estimates by the Iraqi embassy, the Iraqi population in the UK is around 350,000–450,000.

African

Maghrebis

Although data is short, findings indicate Maghrebis make up a substantial community in Europe and the United Kingdom. Britain has long ties with Maghrebis, through contact with the Maghrebis. Nevertheless, Britain has a far lower count of Maghrebis in comparison to France, the Netherlands and Spain, where the majority of Muslims are Maghrebi.

Nigerians

A 2009 government paper estimated the Nigerian Muslim community at 12,000 to 14,000 people. The community is concentrated in London.

Nigerian Muslims in the UK are represented by several community organizations including the Nigeria Muslim Forum.

Somalis

The United Kingdom, with 43,532 Somalia-born residents in 2001, and an estimated 101,000 in 2008, is home to the largest Somali community in Europe. A 2009 estimate by Somali community organisations puts the Somali population figure at 90,000 residents. The first Somali immigrants were seamen and traders who arrived in small numbers in port cities in the late 19th century, although most Somalis in the UK are recent arrivals. Further more Somali European such as from Holland or Denmark have been emigrating in recent years. Established Somali communities are found in Bristol, Cardiff, Liverpool and London, and newer ones have formed in Leicester, Manchester and Sheffield.

White European
Thomas Keith was a Scottish soldier who converted to Islam and became the governor of Medina. Abdullah Quilliam was a 19th-century Englishman who converted to Islam and built what is argued to be the first mosque in the country in Liverpool. He was known locally for his work advocating trade unionism and divorce law reform and persuaded more people in Liverpool to convert but they faced abuse from the wider society.

Branches

An August 2017 survey by the Bertelsmann Stiftung foundation found that among British Muslims, 75% were Sunni and 8% were Shia.
A September 2017 survey by the Institute for Jewish Policy Research (JPR) found that among British Muslims, 77% were Sunni, 5% were Shia, 1% were Ahmadiyya, and 4% were members of other denominations. 14% of British Muslims said they did not know or refused to answer the survey.

The denominational or theme breakdown of mosques and prayer rooms in the UK in 2017 with a sum total of more than 5% were as follows: 41.2% Deobandi, 23.7% Barelvi, 9.4% Salafi, and 5.9% Shia (Twelver, Bohra, Ismaili). 7.4% were non-denominational prayer rooms.

Sunni
In 2015, The Economist stated that were 2.3 million Sunnis in the UK.

Among British Sunnis in 2017, 66.7% were just non-denominational Sunni, 5.9% were Barelvi, 5.0% were Salafis, 4.1% were Deobandi, and 18.3% adhered to another Sunni Islam denomination.

The majority of British mosques are Sunni, including Deobandi, Barelvis and Salafi. In 2010 the affiliation of the mosques was: 44.6% Deobandi, 28.2% Barelvi and other Sufi, 5.8% Salafi, 2.8% Maudoodi-inspired; of the remainder many were part of other Sunni traditions or unaffiliated, while 4.2% were Shi'a (4%). The majority of mosque managers are of Pakistani and Bangladeshi origin, with many Gujarati, and fewer Arab, Turkish and Somali managed entities.

Shia
In 2015, The Economist stated that were 400,000 Shias in the UK.

Shia mosques are usually Twelvers but also cater for Zaydis and the 50,000-strong Ismaili community; they usually include facilities for women. Various Shia mosques include the Husseini Islamic Centre in Stanmore, Harrow which acts as one of the main Shia Muslim mosques in Britain as well as Masjid-e-Ali in Luton, one of the largest Imam Bargah/community centres in the UK. Others include Al Masjid ul Husseini in Northolt, Ealing, and Imam Khoei Islamic Centre in Queens Park, Brent. Across the country Manchester, Birmingham and London have the most Shia residents.

Ahmadiyya 

The Ahmadiyya Muslim Community (AMC) established itself in the UK in 1912 and is thus the longest-standing Muslim community in the UK. The UK and worldwide headquarters of the AMC are currently situated on the grounds of 'The Blessed Mosque' (Masjid Mubarak), inaugurated on 17 May 2019 by Mirza Masroor Ahmad, the fifth caliph of the Ahmadiyya movement, in Tilford, Surrey. The AMC also has the largest Muslim youth organisation, the Ahmadiyya Muslim Youth Association (Majlis Khuddamul Ahmadiyya) in the UK (membership of 7,500) and the largest Muslim women's organisation, the Ahmadiyya Muslim Women's Association, in the UK (membership of 10,000).

Sectarian relations
There has also been discrimination by orthodox Sunni Muslims against Ahmadi Muslims. In 2014, on the 125 anniversary of the establishment of the Ahmadiyya Muslim Community, the Community published an advertisement in the Luton on Sunday. Following a written complaint from Dr Fiaz Hussain, co-ordinator of the Preservation of Finality of Prophethood Forum (PFPF), stating that the Ahmadiyya community should not be called "Muslim" because it rejected some of the basic principles of Islam, the paper received a delegation of 'Community Leaders' and shortly afterwards printed an apology disassociating itself from the Ahmadiyya advertisement. Tell MAMA responded by identifying attempts to intimidate or discriminate against Ahmadiyya Muslims "as anti-Muslim in nature".

Society

Economics
According to analysis based on the 2011 census, Muslims in the United Kingdom face poor standards of housing, poorer levels of education and are more vulnerable to long-term illness, and that Muslims in the UK had the highest rate of unemployment, the poorest health, the most disability and fewest educational qualifications among religious groups. The figures were, to some extent, explained by the fact that Muslims were the least well-established group, having the youngest age profile.

According to a 2013 assessment from the Muslim Council of Britain, it was estimated that there were more than 10,000 Muslim millionaires and 13,400 Muslim-owned businesses in London, creating more than 70,000 jobs and representing just over 33 per cent of Small to Medium Enterprises in London.

Education
In 2018, 34 per cent of British Muslims had degree level qualifications, compared to 30 per cent of Christians and 35 per cent of those with no religion. 13 per cent of Muslims had no qualifications, higher than every other religious group.

In 2006, it was found that approximately 53% of British Muslim youth chose to attend university. This was higher than the figure for Christians (45%) and the non-religious (32%) but lower than for Hindus (77%) and Sikhs (63%).

There are around 184 Muslim faith schools in the UK, 28 of them being state-funded. In 2008, 86.5% of pupils attending Muslim schools achieved five GCSEs, compared to a figure of 72.8% of Roman Catholic schools and 64.5% of secular schools.

In 2019, four Islamic schools were in the top ten ranking for secondary schools in England, including Tauheedul Islam Girls High School in first place. Some Islamic schools have been accused of promoting extremist versions of Islam.

In 2018, the Crown Prosecution Service brought its first prosecution in England & Wales against an unregistered school, the Islamic faith school Al-Istiqamah Learning Centre in Southall, London where nearly 60 children aged 5–11 were being taught. Head teacher Beatrix Bernhardt and director Nacerdine Talbi were convicted as running a school not registered with the Department for Education violates the Education and Skills Act 2008. They received fines and a curfew.

Politics

Muslims are playing an increasingly prominent role in political life. Nineteen Muslim MPs were elected in the December 2019 general election, and there are nineteen Muslim peers in the House of Lords.

The majority of British Muslims vote for the Labour Party, however there are some high-profile Conservative Muslims, including former Minister for Faith and Communities and former Co-Chairman and the Conservative Party Sayeeda Warsi, described by The Guardian as a 'rising star' in the Tory party. The Guardian stated that "The treasury minister is highly regarded on the right and would be the Tories' first Muslim leader." Salma Yaqoob is the former leader of the left-wing Respect Party. Sayeeda Warsi, who was the first Muslim to serve in a British cabinet, was appointed by David Cameron in 2010 as a minister without portfolio. She was made a senior minister of state in 2012. In August 2014 she resigned over the government's approach to the 2014 Israel-Gaza conflict.

Muslim political parties in Britain have included the People's Justice Party (UK), a Pakistani and Kashmiri party that won city council seats in Manchester in the 2000s, and the unsuccessful Islamic Party of Britain, an Islamist party in Bradford in the 1990s.

In the 2017 general election, 15 Muslim MPs (12 Labour and 3 Conservative) were elected, up from 13 Muslim MPs in 2015 general election. In the 2019 general election, a record number of 19 Muslim MPs were elected (15 Labour and 4 Conservative).

Law

Although sharia is not part of the British legal system, several British establishment figures have supported its use in areas of dispute resolution in Islamic communities. For example, in February 2008 Rowan Williams the Archbishop of Canterbury (the head of the Church of England) lectured at the Royal Courts of Justice on Islam and English law. In this lecture he spoke of the possibility of using sharia in some circumstances:

Several months later, Lord Phillips, then Lord Chief Justice of England and Wales supported the idea that sharia could be reasonably employed as a basis for "mediation or other forms of alternative dispute resolution", and explained that "It is not very radical to advocate embracing sharia law in the context of family disputes, for example, and our system already goes a long way towards accommodating the archbishop's suggestion."

In March 2014, The Law Society issued guidance on how to draft sharia-compliant wills for the network of sharia courts which been established to deal with disputes between Muslim families. The guidance was withdrawn later in 2014 following criticism by solicitors and by Chris Grayling, the Justice Secretary.

In 2016–2018 an independent panel commissioned by the UK government investigated the practices of sharia councils operating in England and Wales. The councils have no legal status and no legal jurisdiction in the UK. Estimates for their number range between 30 and 85. The investigation found that most people consulting the councils are women seeking an Islamic divorce. The review concluded that "there is unanimous agreement among the sharia councils themselves that discriminatory practices do occur in some instances within the councils in England and Wales" and made legislative and administrative recommendations to remedy the abuses. The panel was not aware of any sharia councils operating in Scotland.

According to Kaveri Qureshi, while women educate themselves and follow Islamic norms and values referring to colonial era Islamic advice literature about marriage not for continuation but to end their marriages and for justification of remarriages contrary to original intention of authors of the literature.

Media

There are several Islamic television channels operating in the UK, including British Muslim TV, Muslim Television Ahmadiyya International (MTA International), Ummah Channel, Ahlebait TV, and Fadak.

British Muslims are represented in various media positions across different organisations. Notable examples include Mehdi Hasan, the political editor of the UK version of The Huffington Post and the presenter of Al Jazeera English shows The Café and Head to Head, Mishal Husain, a British news presenter for the BBC, currently appearing on BBC World News and BBC Weekend News, Rageh Omaar, special correspondent with ITV and formerly Senior Foreign Correspondent with the BBC and a reporter/presenter for Al Jazeera English, and Faisal Islam, economics editor and correspondent for Channel 4 News.

Associations
 Ahmadiyya Muslim Association
 Association of British Muslims, the oldest organisation of British Muslims, created in 1889 as the English Islamic Association by Abdullah Quilliam.
 Association of Muslim Lawyers
 British Muslim Forum
 Civil Service Islamic Society
 Daru-Al-Moameneen
 Islamic Forum of Europe
 Islamic Party of Britain
 Islamic Society of Britain
 Minhaj-ul-Quran UK
 Mosques & Imams National Advisory Board
 Muslim Association of Britain
 Muslim Council of Britain
 Muslim Educational Trust
 Muslim Parliament of Great Britain
 Muslim Public Affairs Committee UK
 Muslim Safety Forum
 Sufi Muslim Council
 The Young Muslims UK
 UK Islamic Mission
 World Islamic Mission
 Young Muslim Organisation

Practice

Proselytization

It is estimated that 5,200 Britons convert to Islam annually, with a total of about 100,000 converts in 2013. For men, prisons have proven a fertile ground for conversions. About 13% of the prison population, or over 11,000 prisoners, are Muslims, disproportionately higher than the general population. The proportion of Muslims in the UK prison population rose from 8% in 2002 to 15% in 2016. A 2010 report by the Chief Inspector of Prisons stated that 30% of the Muslim prisoners interviewed had converted to Islam while in prison, some of whom were "convenience Muslims" who adopted the religion in order to get benefits available only to Muslims. Mosques in the country are sometimes seen as ethnic clubs which are not welcoming of new converts but there have also been recent convert led mosques.

Extremist ideology

In June 2017, Jeremy Corbyn, leader of the Labour Party, said that difficult conversations are needed, starting with Saudi Arabia and other Gulf states that have funded and fuelled extremist ideology. Tom Brake, Liberal Democrat, foreign affairs spokesman has said that Saudi Arabia provides funding to hundreds of mosques in the UK, espousing a very hardline Wahhabist interpretation of Islam.

The French political scientist Olivier Roy argues that the majority of Islamic terrorists are radicals first and are drawn to fundamentalist Islam as a result, whereas fellow political scientist Gilles Kepel argues that terrorists are radicalized by Salafi ideology before choosing violence. Roy has also argued that the burkini bans and secularist policies of France provoked religious violence in France, to which Kepel responded that Britain has no such policies and still suffered several jihadist attacks in 2017 while there were no major attacks in France.

Some preachers in London's mosques look for Muslim boys who lack clear direction, and set them on the path to radicalisation and terror.

According to Gilles de Kerchove in 2017, the UK had the highest number of Islamist radicals in the EU numbering between 20 and 25,000. Of those, 3000 were considered a direct threat by MI5 and 500 were under constant surveillance. Among those known to security services but not considered an immediate threat were the terrorists of three ISIS-linked attacks in 2017 which killed 35 victims in the UK.

In July 2017, a report by the Henry Jackson Society, a neo-conservative think tank, claimed that Middle Eastern nations are providing financial support to mosques and Islamic educational institutions that have been linked to the spread of extremist material with "an illiberal, bigoted Wahhabi ideology". The report said that the number of Salafi and Wahhabi mosques in Britain had increased from 68 in 2007 to 110 in 2014.

Hardline groups, including Hizb-ut-Tahrir, use accusations of Islamophobia to silence legitimate debate about extremism. While they in general are opposed to Western-style human rights, they use human rights to promote an Islamist ideology.

Relations with wider society

Attitudes
In 2019, a survey conducted by the Pew Research Center found that 78% of Britons had a favourable view of Muslims, while 18% had an unfavourable view of Muslims. This was the most favourable in Europe.

The British media has been criticised for propagating negative stereotypes of Muslims and fueling Islamophobic prejudice. In 2006, several British cabinet ministers were criticised for helping to "unleash a public anti-Muslim backlash" by blaming the Muslim community over issues of integration despite a study commissioned by the Home Office on white and Asian-Muslim youths demonstrating otherwise: that Asian-Muslim youths "are in fact the most tolerant of all" and that white youths "have far more intolerant attitudes," concluding that the attitudes held by members of the white community was a greater "barrier to integration." Another survey by Gallup in 2009 also found that the Muslim community claimed to feel more patriotic about Britain than the general British population as a whole, while another survey found that Muslims assert that they support the role of Christianity in British life more so than British Christians themselves. In January 2010, the British Social Attitudes Survey found that the general public "is far more likely to hold negative views of Muslims than of any other religious group," with "just one in four" feeling "positively about Islam," and a "majority of the country would be concerned if a mosque was built in their area, while only 15 per cent expressed similar qualms about the opening of a church." The "scapegoating" of British Muslims by the media and politicians in the 21st century has been compared in the media to the rise of antisemitism in the early 20th century. A survey conducted in 2017 revealed widespread opposition to Muslim immigration across UK. 47% are opposed to further Muslim immigration, according to a survey conducted by Chatham House. Furthermore, 55% of Britons believe there is a fundamental clash between Islam and the values of British society, according to a YouGov poll. Various other surveys have also shown that such attitudes amongst all European citizens. A 2013 survey indicated that immigrants from Muslim countries were perceived as integrating less well into British society than immigrants from other countries were. Another poll revealed that 28% of British Muslims hoped that Britain would one day become an Islamic state, while 52% disagreed, and 20% did not venture an opinion either way.

According to one survey from 2006, around 81% of Muslims think of themselves as Muslim first. This is consistent with Muslims living in Muslim-majority countries, who also tend to think of themselves as Muslim first rather than identifying with nation states (for example 87% of Pakistanis identify themselves as Muslim first rather than Pakistani). However, around 83% of Muslims are proud to be a British citizen, compared to 79% of the general public, 77% of Muslims strongly identify with Britain while only 50% of the wider population do, 86.4% of Muslims feel they belong in Britain, slightly more than the 85.9% of Christians, 82% of Muslims want to live in diverse and mixed neighbourhoods compared to 63% of non-Muslim Britons. In polls taken across Europe 2006, British Muslims hold the most negative view of westerners out of all Muslims in Europe, whilst overall in Britain 63% of British hold the most favourable view of Muslims out of all the European countries (down from 67% the year before).

On religious issues, a 2007 poll reported that 36% of 16- to 24-year-olds believed if a Muslim converted to another religion they should be punished by death, compared to 19% of 55+ year old Muslims. A poll reported that 59% of Muslims would prefer to live under British law, compared to 28% who would prefer to live under sharia law. 61% of respondents agreed with the statement that homosexuality is wrong and should be illegal. This appeared to be borne out by a Gallup poll in 2009 of 500 British Muslims, none of whom believed that homosexuality was morally acceptable. Such polls suggest that British Muslims have strongly conservative views on issues relating to extra-marital and/or homosexual sexual acts compared with their European Muslim counterparts – who are markedly more liberal. However, a poll conducted by Demos in 2011 reported that a greater proportion of Muslims (47% – slightly higher than the 46.5% of Christians who agreed with the statement) than other religions agreed with the statement "I am proud of how Britain treats gay people", with less than 11% disagreeing. On 18 May 2013, just as the bill to legalise same-sex marriages was being prepared to pass into law, over 400 leading Muslims including head teachers and senior representatives of mosques across the country, published an open letter opposing the bill on the grounds that "Muslim parents will be robbed of their right to raise their children according to their beliefs, as homosexual relationships are taught as something normal to their primary-aged children".

Culture
In 2013, there were 40 Muslim players in the English Premier League, up from one in 1992. Man of the Match awardees were awarded bottles of champagne, which is forbidden in Islam, and after Muslim player Yaya Toure refused the award, champagne was phased out for small trophies instead. Children playing football have been seen falling to their knees as if in prayer after scoring a goal, a common practice of Muslim footballers.

Islamophobia

There have been cases of threats, one fatal attack, and non-fatal attacks on Muslims and on Muslim targets, including attacks on Muslim graves and mosques. In January 2010, a report from the University of Exeter's European Muslim Research Centre noted that the number of anti-Muslim hate crimes has increased, ranging from "death threats and murder to persistent low-level assaults, such as spitting and name-calling," for which the media and politicians have been blamed with fueling anti-Muslim hatred. However, Met Police figures showed an 8.5 per cent fall in anti-Muslim crimes between 2009 and 2012, with a spike in 2013 due to the murder of Lee Rigby.

The emergence of the English Defence League resulted in demonstrations in English cities with large Muslim populations. The EDL was a right wing, anti Islam street protest movement which opposed what it considers to be a spread of Islamism, Sharia law and Islamic extremism in the United Kingdom. The EDL has been described by The Jewish Chronicle as Islamophobic. The group has faced confrontations with various groups, including supporters of Unite Against Fascism (UAF) and Anonymous, of which the latter has also harassed Muslims as well.

Sikh relations
According to the UK prison officers' union in 2013, some Muslim prisoners in the UK had allegedly forcibly converted fellow inmates to Islam in prisons. In 2018, a report by a Sikh activist organisation, Sikh Youth UK, entitled "The Religiously Aggravated Sexual Exploitation of Young Sikh Women Across the UK" made allegations of similarities between the case of Sikh women and the Rotherham child sexual exploitation scandal. However, in 2019 this report was criticised by researchers and an official UK government report lead by two Sikh academics for false and misleading information. It noted: "The RASE report lacks solid data, methodological transparency and rigour. It is filled instead with sweeping generalisations and poorly substantiated claims around the nature and scale of abuse of Sikh girls and causal factors driving it. It appealed heavily to historical tensions between Sikhs and Muslims and narratives of honour in a way that seemed designed to whip up fear and hate". Another investigation by another Sikh scholar, Katy Sian of the University of York, also found no truth to the allegations and instead found it was an allegation being pushed by extremist Sikh groups.

Antisemitism

According to British Muslim journalist Mehdi Hasan, "anti-Semitism isn't just tolerated in some sections of the British Muslim community; it's routine and commonplace". A 2016 survey of 5,446 adult Britons, part of a report titled Anti-Semitism in contemporary Great Britain conducted by the London-based Institute for Jewish Policy Research found that the prevalence of anti-semitic views among Muslims was two to four times higher than the rest of the population, that 55% of British Muslims held at least one anti-semitic view (compared to 30% of the general population), and that there was a correlation between Muslim religiosity and antisemitism. A 2020 poll found that 45% of British Muslims held a generally favourable view of British Jews, and 18% held a negative view.

Notable Muslims

Politics
 Waqar Azmi OBE, EU Ambassador of Intercultural Dialogue
 Sadiq Khan, mayor of London

Religious
 Allama Qamaruzzaman Azmi, Leader of World Islamic Mission
 Shaykh Muhammad al-Ya’qoubi of Al-Mustafa Centre
 Sheikh Muhammad Shakeel Qadiri al Ridawi of [Zia-e-Akhtar Islamic Academy]] London 
 Muhammad Arshad Misbahi Imam of Manchester Central Mosque
 Sheikh Abdul Qayum, Chief Imam of East London Mosque
 Abu Yusuf Riyadh ul Haq, khateeb of Birmingham Central Mosque
 Faiz-ul-Aqtab Siddiqi, principal of Hijaz College
 Ajmal Masroor, imam and politician
 Haitham al-Haddad, Britain Muslim television host
 Ibrahim Mogra, Leicester imam
 Joel Hayward, New Zealand-born British Islamic scholar
 Timothy Winter, Dean of Cambridge Muslim College and Director of Studies at Cambridge University

Philanthropy
 Muhammad Imdad Hussain Pirzada of Muslim Charity and Jamia Al-Karam
 Muhammad Abdul Bari, secretary of Muslim Aid

Notable mosques

 Shah Jahan Mosque, Woking – Britain's first mosque
 Cambridge Central Mosque, Europe's first eco-friendly mosque and the first purpose-built mosque within the city of Cambridge
 Ghamkol Shariff Masjid, Birmingham
 Manchester Central Mosque, Manchester
 Madina Mosque (Sheffield), Sheffield
 Green Lane Masjid, Birmingham
 Markazi Mosque, Dewsbury – Headquarters of the Tablighi Jama'at
 Al-Rahma Mosque, Liverpool
 Jamia Masjid Ahl-e Hadith, Rotherham
 Jamea Masjid, Preston
 Birmingham Central Mosque
 East London Mosque, London
 Leeds Grand Mosque, Leeds
 Finsbury Park Mosque, London
 Abbey Mills Mosque, London
 Glasgow Central Mosque, Glasgow
 Husseini Islamic Centre Stanmore, London

See also

 Islam in England
 Islam in London
 Islam in Birmingham
 Islam in Northern Ireland
 Islam in Scotland
 Islam in Wales
 Islam in France
 List of British Muslims
 Muslims in Western Europe
 Religion in the United Kingdom
 Islam in the Republic of Ireland

Notes

References

 .

Further reading
 Koenig, Matthias. "Incorporating Muslim migrants in Western nation states—a comparison of the United Kingdom, France, and Germany." in Marian Burchardt & Ines Michalowski, eds.,  After Integration (Springer Fachmedien Wiesbaden, 2015) pp. 43–58.
 Lewicki, Aleksandra, and Therese O’Toole. "Acts and practices of citizenship: Muslim women’s activism in the UK. "Ethnic and Racial Studies 40#1 (2017): 152-171.
 Lewicki, Aleksandra. Social Justice Through Citizenship?: The Politics of Muslim Integration in Germany and Great Britain (Springer, 2014).
 Lewis, Valerie A., and Ridhi Kashyap. "Piety in a Secular Society: Migration, Religiosity, and Islam in Britain." International Migration 51#3 (2013): 57–66.
 Model, Suzanne, and Lang Lin. "The cost of not being Christian: Hindus, Sikhs and Muslims in Britain and Canada." International Migration Review 36#4 (2002): 1061–1092.
 Peach, Ceri, and Richard Gale. "Muslims, Hindus, and Sikhs in the new religious landscape of England." Geographical Review 93#4 (2003): 469–490.

External links

 BBC: Islam and Britain Before the 20th Century
 Muslim Council of Britain
 Hassan Mahamdallie "Muslim working class struggles", International Socialism'', 4 January 2007
 Muslims In Britain, Guide and Directory